John Ker (1789–1850) was an American surgeon, planter and politician in Louisiana. Together with several major Mississippi planters, in the 1830s Ker co-founded the Mississippi Colonization Society, promoting removal of free American blacks to a colony in West Africa (later Liberia). The state group modeled itself after the American Colonization Society, where Ker later served as a vice president.

Born in North Carolina, where his father was the first president of the new state university, Ker moved with his family as a youth to Mississippi after 1817, when his father was appointed to the state supreme court. He went to medical school in Philadelphia, Pennsylvania and returned to the South. Serving as a surgeon in the War of 1812 and Creek War, Ker later owned a cotton plantation in Louisiana and served in the state house.

Early life
John Ker was born on June 27, 1789 in Chapel Hill, North Carolina. His father, David Ker (1758–1805), born in Downpatrick, Northern Ireland and of Scottish ancestry, immigrated with his wife Mary to the United States in the 1780s. He served as the first President of the University of North Carolina at Chapel Hill, which was chartered in 1789 and opened for students in 1795.

The family moved to Mississippi about 1817, the year it became a state. President Thomas Jefferson (1743–1826) appointed the father David Ker to the Supreme Court of Mississippi.

John Ker had been educated privately, as was common among the southern upper class. He went North to medical school, earning a Doctor of Medicine degree from the Medical School at the University of Pennsylvania in Philadelphia, Pennsylvania in 1822.

Career
Ker worked as a medical doctor. He served as a surgeon for the US Army in the War of 1812 and the Creek War of 1813–1814.

Ker also became a planter, owning the Good Hope Plantation in Concordia Parish, Louisiana, which produced cotton as a commodity crop, based on slave labor. He was a patron of Oakland College, near Rodney, Mississippi, a college founded by Rev. Jeremiah Chamberlain (1794-1851) that closed during the American Civil War.

In the 1830s, Ker was elected and served in the Louisiana State Senate. That same decade, together with major slave owners Isaac Ross (1760-1838), Edward McGehee (1786-1880), Stephen Duncan (1787-1867), and educator Chamberlain, all of Mississippi, he co-founded the Mississippi Colonization Society (MCS). Its goal was to send free people of color to a colony run by the society called Mississippi-in-Africa, in order to remove them from southern slave societies. Ker served as a vice-president of the society. The organization was modeled after the American Colonization Society and focused on free people of color in Mississippi and later Louisiana, both of which had large enslaved populations. The Mississippi-in-Africa colony ultimately merged into the Colony of Liberia.

Additionally, Ker later served as one of the vice presidents of the American Colonization Society.

Personal life

He married Mary Kenard Baker, the daughter of Joshua Baker (1799–1885), who later served as the 22nd Governor of Louisiana in 1868. They had four sons and two daughters:
David Ker (1825-1884).
Sarah Evelina Ker (1826-1868). She married Richard E. Butler.
John Ker (1826-1870).
Lewis Ker (1831-1894).
Mary Susan Ker (1838-1923).
William H. Ker (1841-1902).

Ker and his family summered at Linden, a mansion on the bluffs above the river in Natchez, Mississippi. It is now listed on the National Register of Historic Places. The property was formerly owned by Thomas Buck Reed (1787–1829), a United States Senator from Mississippi and son-in-law of Isaac Ross, whom Ker knew through the Mississippi Colonization Society.

Ker was a Presbyterian, the Protestant church strongly associated with Scotland and its emigrants.

References

1789 births
1850 deaths
American people of Anglo-Irish descent
American people of Scottish descent
People from Concordia Parish, Louisiana
Politicians from Natchez, Mississippi
Perelman School of Medicine at the University of Pennsylvania alumni
People of the Creek War
United States Army personnel of the War of 1812
United States Army Medical Corps officers
American planters
Louisiana state senators
American Presbyterians
19th-century American politicians
American slave owners
19th-century American physicians
American colonization movement
People from Chapel Hill, North Carolina
Ulster Scots people